The original 1 World Trade Center (also known as the North Tower, Tower 1, Building One, or 1 WTC) was one of the Twin Towers of the original World Trade Center in New York City.

It was distinguishable from its twin, the original 2 World Trade Center, also known as the South Tower, by the  telecommunications antenna on its roof. Including the antenna, the building stood at a total height of 1730ft (527,3m). Other things that made the North Tower distinguishable from its twin was that there was a canopy connected to the North Tower's west facade on street level and there were two small pedestrian walkways that extended from the west and south promenades of Three and Six World Trade Center to the North Tower's north and south facades on plaza level, while the South Tower lacked any of those. The building's address was 1 World Trade Center, and the WTC complex had its own ZIP code (10048) due to its large size.

The original World Trade Center was destroyed in the terrorist attacks of September 11, 2001. Struck by American Airlines Flight 11 at 8:46 a.m., the North Tower was the first of the Twin Towers to be hit by a hijacked aircraft, and the second to collapse, at 10:28 a.m. The North Tower stood for 102 minutes after the aircraft impact. Of the 2,977 victims killed in the attacks, around 1,600 were in the North Tower or on the ground.

The North Tower was replaced by the present-day One World Trade Center tower, which was opened in November 2014 as the lead building of the redeveloped World Trade Center site.

Tenants at the time of the attacks
The tenant list below was compiled from the original list provided by CoStar Group (a provider of electronic commercial real estate information), and quoted by CNN. It was sourced by using UnBlinking.com. Cantor Fitzgerald's corporate headquarters were located in 1 World Trade Center.

Note: Floor numbers in  red  were part of American Airlines Flight 11’s impact area on September 11, 2001, with floors trapped by the impact numbered in  dark gray .

SOURCES: CoStar Group, CNN, and Unblinking.

Floor unknown: Alliance Global Finance, Associated Charter Marine, Carreden Group, CIF Agency, Dimetol International Trade, Eastern Capital Corporation, Falcon International Freight, First Pacific Rim, GAC Shipping, Garwood Financial, Globe Shipping Company, GSI Cargo Service, Hachijuni Bank, Hanil Securities, Lin Brothers International, Pluto Commodities, Port Newark

92nd floor
The 92nd floor, though intact and below the initial impact, did not have any survivors. Several 911 calls were recorded from employees at Carr Futures, a tenant on the 92nd floor. The workers reported that the elevators were destroyed and the stairwells impassable. A number of employees in a meeting were trapped in a conference room when its door jammed shut from the crash; the remainder made their way to an unoccupied area on the west side of the floor initially free of smoke and flames. However, by the time the North Tower collapsed at 10:28 AM, fire had spread to that part of the floor, making conditions there unsurvivable. The last 911 call from that floor came from Tom McGinnis at 10:26 AM.

Tenants that left prior to the attacks
Between 1978 and 1995, the Consulate of Paraguay was located in Suite 1609 of 1 World Trade Center. Home Lines once occupied Suite 3969.

References

External links

 "WTC Response Update: Governor Pataki Announces Partnership To Help New York City Businesses In Need Of Office Space". CoStar Group.
 List of World Trade Center tenants via CNN (Archive)
 World Trade Center Tenant Relocation Summary  via TenantWise.com
 World Trade Center Tragedy: Information for Families, Friends and Colleagues – Marsh and McLennan Companies

World Trade Center
Lists of companies based in New York (state)
Manhattan-related lists
One